Ulundurpettai Airport is an unused airport near Ulundurpettai town. This airport was operated as an airbase by the British during World War II, who later it left unused and turned it into barren land, although the airstrip remains undamaged.

The Coast Guard of India tried to convert and use this airport, but this work was shelved for unknown reasons. This airstrip was last used during the opening ceremony of NLC India ltd, for which Prime Minister Jawaharlal Nehru attended, landing at this airstrip.

Now this airstrip has been taken by the government of India with plans to construct a new airport under the UDAN scheme.

References 

Airports in Tamil Nadu
Defunct airports in India
1940 establishments in India